Dan Vyleta is a German–Canadian writer, whose novel The Crooked Maid was shortlisted for the 2013 Scotiabank Giller Prize. His first novel Pavel & I was published in 2008 and translated into German, Spanish, Portuguese, Hebrew, Dutch, Danish, Italian and Czech.  His second novel, The Quiet Twin, was a shortlisted nominee for the 2011 Rogers Writers' Trust Fiction Prize. Both books gathered considerable critical acclaim and were widely reviewed by the Canadian, British and American press.

Born and raised in Gelsenkirchen in the Ruhr Valley region of Germany to Czech expatriate parents, Vyleta attended university in the United Kingdom, studying History as an undergraduate at Girton College, Cambridge before receiving his PhD  in the same subject from King's College, Cambridge. In 2007 he moved to Canada when his wife accepted a professorship with the University of Alberta. He has taught history, literature and creative writing at a variety of higher educational institutions in Canada, Germany, the United States and the UK.

Vyleta is currently teaching creative writing at the University of Birmingham.

He has published both novels and historical non-fiction work. His academic monograph Crime, Jews, and News, Vienna 1895–1914 (Berghahn 2007) discusses Austrian criminology and anti-Semitism.

Works
Crime, Jews, and News, Vienna 1895–1914 (2006)
Pavel & I (2008)
The Quiet Twin (2011)
The Crooked Maid (2013)
Smoke (2016)
Soot (2020), sequel to Smoke

References

External links
Dan Vyleta

1974 births
Living people
21st-century Canadian novelists
21st-century German novelists
Alumni of Girton College, Cambridge
Alumni of King's College, Cambridge
21st-century Canadian historians
Canadian male novelists
Canadian people of Czech descent
German emigrants to Canada
21st-century German historians
German male novelists
German people of Czech descent
21st-century Canadian male writers
Canadian male non-fiction writers
German male non-fiction writers